State Route 683 (SR 683) is a north–south state highway in the southern portion of the U.S. state of Ohio.

Route description
State Route 683 is located entirely within Vinton County.  This state highway is not included as a component of the National Highway System, a system of highways deemed most important for the nation's economy, mobility and defense.

History
State Route 683 was designated in 1937.  Its original routing is the same one within Vinton County that it utilizes to this day.  There have been no significant changes to the routing of this highway since its inception.  The only change to have taken place with respect to State Route 683 is the route that it meets at its southern terminus.  What is now a part of State Route 93 was known as State Route 75 back in 1937.

Major intersections

References

683
Transportation in Vinton County, Ohio